Align-m is a multiple sequence alignment program written by Ivo Van Walle.

Align-m has the ability to accomplish the following tasks:
 multiple sequence alignment,
 include extra information to guide the sequence alignment,
 multiple structural alignment,
 homology modeling by (iteratively) combining sequence and structure alignment data,
 'filtering' of BLAST or other pairwise alignments,
 combining many alignments into one consensus sequence,
 multiple genome alignment (can cope with rearrangements).

See also 
 Sequence alignment software
 Clustal

External links 
 Official website

Bioinformatics
Computational_phylogenetics